Stick 'Em Up is the fifth studio album by Canadian Rock/Blues band The Perpetrators released in 2013, which Walter de Paduwa (known as Dr Boogie) described as: “The dirtiest stuff you made [sic] so far, and the more accessible for my greasy ears…” Accompanying the release, the band returned to Belgium and the Netherlands for the first time since 2009.

Track listing
 "Sweetgrass"
 "Spend More Money"
 "You've Got to Tell Me"
 "Smokes 'n Chicken"
 "Tired of Tryin to Keep My Cool"
 "I Must Be Crazy"
 "Who's It Gonna Be"
 "Shake It"
 "Bad Man"
 "Take You On"

External links
Official Perpetrators web site

The Perpetrators albums
2013 albums